The Langeberg Rebellion of 1896–97, also known as Ntwa ya Bana ba Mokgothu in SeTswana, was a war of resistance waged by two Tswana groups: the Batlhaping and the Batlharo, against British settlers in the Griqualand West area of the Northern Cape.  The Rebellion was triggered when the Tswana began became suspicious about the intentions of the Cape Colonial government as they feared, justifiably, that they stood to lose land and were being marginalised in the growing market economy of the Cape.  The Langeberg Rebellion consisted of a series of revolts between December 1896 and August 1897 against British land annexations in the Griqualand West area. The Rebellion was led by chiefs Kgosi Luka Jantjie and Kgosi Galeshewe of the Batlhaping and chief Toto Makgolokwe of the Batlharo.

External links
 The last stand of South African hero
 Luka Jantjie, Galeshewe and Toto – their little known story of courage and bravery in defence of their people, land and livelihoods
 African Military History

References

Conflicts in 1896
Conflicts in 1897
Military history of the Cape Colony
African resistance to colonialism
1896 in the Cape Colony
1897 in the Cape Colony